Golden Kamuy is a Japanese manga series written and illustrated by Satoru Noda. It is set in Hokkaido, Japan, and follows Saichi "Immortal" Sugimoto, a Japanese soldier surviving the Russo-Japanese War, trying to provide for his dead comrade's wife, and Asirpa, an Ainu girl searching for her father's murderer. The two search for a hidden stash of Ainu gold, stolen by a criminal group, which also is targeted by the 7th Division of the Imperial Japanese Army.

The manga was serialized in Shueisha's  manga magazine Weekly Young Jump from 2014 to 2022. Its chapters have been collected in tankōbon volumes, published by Shueisha in Japan since 2015 and by Viz Media in North America since 2017; 31 volumes have been released in Japanese, and 28 in English.


Volume list

|}

References

External links
 Golden Kamuy at Young Jump 

Golden Kamuy chapters